Shahjahan Saju is a Jatiya Party (Ershad) politician and the former Member of Parliament of Narsingdi-3.

Career
Saju was elected to parliament from Narsingdi-3 as a Jatiya Party candidate in 1988. He is the former Narsingdi District council president.

References

Jatiya Party politicians
Living people
4th Jatiya Sangsad members
Year of birth missing (living people)